The Convention on the Nationality of Married Women is an international convention passed by the United Nations General Assembly in 1957. It entered into force in 1958 and as of 2013 it has 74 state parties.

Background
Before the Convention on the Nationality of Married Women, no legislation existed to protect married women's right to retain or renounce national citizenship in the way that men could. Women's rights groups recognized a need to legally protect the citizenship rights of women who married someone from outside their country or nationality. The League of Nations, the international organization later succeeded by the United Nations, was lobbied by women's rights groups during the early 20th century to address the lack of international laws recognizing married women's rights of national citizenship. The Conference for the Codification of International Law, held at The Hague in 1930, drew protests from international women's rights groups, yet the League declined to include legislation enforcing married women's nationality rights. The League took the position that it was not their role, but the role of member states, to deal with equality between men and women.

The International Women's Suffrage Alliance (IWSA, later renamed the International Alliance of Women) launched a telegram campaign in 1931 to pressure the League of Nations to address the lack of legislation. Women from around the world sent telegrams to the League of Nations as a protest. The League made the concession of creating an unfunded Consultative Committee on Nationality of Women.

The Pan-American Conference in Montevideo passed a Convention on the Nationality of Women in 1933. It was passed by the Pan American Conference at the same time as the Treaty on the Equality of Rights Between Men and Women. These were the first pieces of international law to "explicitly set sexual equality as a principle to be incorporated into national legislation" which was required of countries ratifying the convention and treaty. Lobbying by the American National Women's Party has been credited with this legislation. However, neither the International Labour Organization (ILO) nor the League of Nations passed any legislation on the issue during the interwar years.

Entry into force
The issue of the nationality of married women was a leading women's rights issue facing the United Nations after its establishment. The United Nations Commission on the Status of Women was created, and made it a priority of their agenda, launching a study in 1948. The Commission recommended to the United Nations Economic and Social Council that legislation be drafted to give women equal rights as set out in Article 15 of the Universal Declaration of Human Rights. The Convention on the Nationality of Married Women entered into force on 11 August 1958.

As of 2013, the convention has been ratified by 74 states. It has been denounced by the ratifying states of Luxembourg, Netherlands, and United Kingdom.

Purpose
The Convention was concluded in the light of the conflicts of law on nationality derived from provisions concerning the loss or acquisition of nationality by women as a result of marriage, divorce, or of the change of nationality by the husband during marriage. It allows women to adopt the nationality of their husband based upon the woman's own decision, but does not require it.

The Convention seeks to fulfill aspirations articulated in Article 15 of the Universal Declaration of Human Rights that "everyone has a right to a nationality" and "no one shall be arbitrarily deprived of his nationality nor denied the right to change his nationality".

Key principles
Article 1
 Woman's nationality not to be automatically affected by marriage to an alien.

Article 2
 Acquisition or renunciation of a nationality by a husband not to prevent the wife's retention of her nationality.

Article 3
 Specially privileged nationality procedures to be available for wives to take the nationality of their husbands.

See also
Citizenship
Statelessness
Statelessness Reduction Convention

References

External links
 Full Convention Text
Signatures and ratifications.

Family law treaties
Marriage law
Women's rights instruments
Nationality treaties
Treaties entered into force in 1958
United Nations treaties
Treaties concluded in 1957
Treaties adopted by United Nations General Assembly resolutions
Treaties of the People's Socialist Republic of Albania
Treaties of Antigua and Barbuda
Treaties of Argentina
Treaties of Armenia
Treaties of Australia
Treaties of Austria
Treaties of Azerbaijan
Treaties of the Bahamas
Treaties of Barbados
Treaties of the Byelorussian Soviet Socialist Republic
Treaties of Bosnia and Herzegovina
Treaties of the military dictatorship in Brazil
Treaties of the People's Republic of Bulgaria
Treaties of Canada
Treaties of the Republic of China (1949–1971)
Treaties of Ivory Coast
Treaties of Croatia
Treaties of Cuba
Treaties of Cyprus
Treaties of Czechoslovakia
Treaties of the Czech Republic
Treaties of Denmark
Treaties of the Dominican Republic
Treaties of Ecuador
Treaties of Fiji
Treaties of Finland
Treaties of West Germany
Treaties of East Germany
Treaties of Ghana
Treaties of Guatemala
Treaties of the Hungarian People's Republic
Treaties of Iceland
Treaties of Ireland
Treaties of Israel
Treaties of Jamaica
Treaties of Jordan
Treaties of Kazakhstan
Treaties of Kyrgyzstan
Treaties of Latvia
Treaties of Lesotho
Treaties of Liberia
Treaties of the Libyan Arab Jamahiriya
Treaties of Malawi
Treaties of the Federation of Malaya
Treaties of Mali
Treaties of Malta
Treaties of Mauritius
Treaties of Mexico
Treaties of Montenegro
Treaties of New Zealand
Treaties of Nicaragua
Treaties of Norway
Treaties of the Polish People's Republic
Treaties of the Socialist Republic of Romania
Treaties of the Soviet Union
Treaties of Rwanda
Treaties of Serbia and Montenegro
Treaties of Yugoslavia
Treaties of Sierra Leone
Treaties of Singapore
Treaties of Slovakia
Treaties of Slovenia
Treaties of South Africa
Treaties of the Dominion of Ceylon
Treaties of Saint Lucia
Treaties of Saint Vincent and the Grenadines
Treaties of Eswatini
Treaties of Sweden
Treaties of North Macedonia
Treaties of Trinidad and Tobago
Treaties of Tunisia
Treaties of Uganda
Treaties of the Ukrainian Soviet Socialist Republic
Treaties of Tanganyika
Treaties of Venezuela
Treaties of Zambia
Treaties of Zimbabwe
1957 in New York (state)
Treaties extended to the Cook Islands
Treaties extended to Tokelau
Treaties extended to Niue
Treaties extended to Ashmore and Cartier Islands
Treaties extended to the Australian Antarctic Territory
Treaties extended to Christmas Island
Treaties extended to the Cocos (Keeling) Islands
Treaties extended to Heard Island and McDonald Islands
Treaties extended to Norfolk Island
Treaties extended to the Coral Sea Islands
Treaties extended to the Colony of Aden
Treaties extended to the Colony of the Bahamas
Treaties extended to the West Indies Federation
Treaties extended to Basutoland
Treaties extended to the Bechuanaland Protectorate
Treaties extended to Bermuda
Treaties extended to British Guiana
Treaties extended to British Honduras
Treaties extended to the British Solomon Islands
Treaties extended to British Somaliland
Treaties extended to British Cyprus
Treaties extended to the Falkland Islands
Treaties extended to the Colony of Fiji
Treaties extended to the Gambia Colony and Protectorate
Treaties extended to the Gilbert and Ellice Islands
Treaties extended to Gibraltar
Treaties extended to British Hong Kong
Treaties extended to British Kenya
Treaties extended to the British Virgin Islands
Treaties extended to the Crown Colony of Malta
Treaties extended to British Mauritius
Treaties extended to the Colony of North Borneo
Treaties extended to Saint Helena, Ascension and Tristan da Cunha
Treaties extended to the Colony of Sarawak
Treaties extended to Tanganyika (territory)
Treaties extended to the Crown Colony of Seychelles
Treaties extended to the Colony of Sierra Leone
Treaties extended to the Crown Colony of Singapore
Treaties extended to Swaziland (protectorate)
Treaties extended to the Uganda Protectorate
Treaties extended to the Sultanate of Zanzibar
Treaties extended to the Federation of Rhodesia and Nyasaland
Treaties extended to the Kingdom of Tonga (1900–1970)
Treaties extended to Brunei (protectorate)
Treaties extended to Aruba
Treaties extended to the Aden Protectorate
Treaties extended to West Berlin
1957 in women's history